The Totem Heritage Center is a historical and cultural museum founded in 1976 and located in Ketchikan, Alaska. The center is operated by the city of Ketchikan.

The location of the Totem Heritage Center was listed on the National Register of Historic Places as Alaska Totems on June 21, 1971.

History 
The center was founded in 1976 to preserve these totems and act as a cultural center. Sixteen of the museum's thirty-three totem poles are on permanent display, although the rest of the collection is available for research purposes. The center also exhibits other Tlingit, Haida, and Tsimshian artifacts and art pieces, including work by world-famous Tlingit carver Nathan Jackson, and renowned Haida weaver Delores Churchill.

In November 1990, a Ravenstail Weaver's Guild was formed in Ketchikan through the Totem Heritage Center. The guild served to strengthen the almost extinct craft of Ravenstail weaving and the community of makers of both Native and non-Natives in the United States and Canada.

About 
The Heritage Center houses one of the world's largest collections of unrestored 19th century totem poles. The poles were recovered from uninhabited Tlingit settlements on Village Island and Tongass Island, south of Ketchikan, as well as from the Haida village of Old Kasaan.

In addition to functioning as a museum, the Totem Heritage Center preserves and promotes the traditional arts and crafts of the Tlingit, Haida, and Tsimshian peoples through a nationally recognized program of art classes and other activities. Classes are held throughout the year, and the museum is open to visitors year-round, with extended hours during the summer.

See also
National Register of Historic Places listings in Ketchikan Gateway Borough, Alaska

References

External links
 

1976 establishments in Alaska
Art museums and galleries in Alaska
Buildings and structures in Ketchikan Gateway Borough, Alaska
Ketchikan, Alaska
Museums established in 1976
Native American museums in Alaska
Tourist attractions in Ketchikan Gateway Borough, Alaska
Totem poles
National Register of Historic Places in Ketchikan Gateway Borough, Alaska